Andrzej Wawrzyk (born 26 September 1987) is a Polish heavyweight boxer. He challenged once for the WBA (Regular) world heavyweight title in 2013.

Amateur career
Wawrzyk won the European junior title 2006 beating future world champion Ciocan in the semifinal.

At the World Junior Championships 2006 he lost to eventual runner-up Sardor Abdullayev 9:15 in the quarter-final.

Professional career
Wawrzyk turned professional on 18 November 2006, winning his first professional bout by four-round unanimous decision. From his pro debut to March 2013, Wawrzyk racked up an impressive record of 27–0, 14 KOs.

On 17 May 2013 he travelled to Russia to challenge for the WBA (regular) heavyweight title held by Alexander Povetkin, and in doing so suffered his first professional loss by third-round TKO. In 2014, Wawrzyk scored two notable wins over former British and Commonwealth heavyweight champion Danny Williams by first-round TKO, and former IBF world heavyweight champion Francois Botha by fifth-round TKO. In September 2016, he defeated former world heavyweight title challenger Albert Sosnowski by sixth-round TKO.

His next professional contest was scheduled for February 2017 against reigning and undefeated WBC heavyweight champion Deontay Wilder in Birmingham, Alabama. But Wilder was forced to find a new opponent for the next defence of his WBC heavyweight title after Wawrzyk failed a drug test (Stanozolol).

Professional boxing record

|style="text-align:center;" colspan="9"|34 fights, 33 wins (19 knockouts), 1 losses
|-style="text-align:center;background:#e3e3e3;"
|style="border-style:none none solid solid;"|
|style="border-style:none none solid solid;"|Result
|style="border-style:none none solid solid;"|Record
|style="border-style:none none solid solid;"|Opponent
|style="border-style:none none solid solid;"|Type
|style="border-style:none none solid solid;"|Round, time
|style="border-style:none none solid solid;"|Date
|style="border-style:none none solid solid;"|Location
|style="border-style:none none solid solid;"|Notes
|-align=center
|34
|Win
|33–1
|align=left| Albert Sosnowski
|TKO
|6 (10), 0:01
|17 Sep 2016
|align=left| 
|align=left| 
|-align=center
|33
|Win
|32–1
|align=left| Marcin Rekowski
|TKO
|7 (10), 0:42
|02 Apr 2016
|align=left| 
|align=left|
|-align=center
|32
|Win
|31–1
|align=left| Mike Sheppard
|TKO
|3 (10), 2:59
|26 Sep 2015
|align=left| 
|align=left|
|-align=center
|31
|Win
|30–1
|align=left| Patryk Kowoll
|KO
|2 (8), 1:03
|21 Jul 2015
|align=left| 
|
|-align=center
|30
|Win
|29–1
|align=left| Francois Botha
|TKO
|5 (10), 1:56
|15 Mar 2014
|align=left| 
|
|-align=center
|29
|Win
|28–1
|align=left| Danny Williams
|TKO
|1 (10), 2:01
|01 Feb 2014
|align=left| 
|
|-align=center
|28
|Loss
|27–1
|align=left| Alexander Povetkin
|TKO
|3 (12), 2:23
|17 May 2013
|align=left| 
|align=left|
|-align=center
|27
|Win
|27–0
|align=left| Robert Hawkins
|UD
|6
|23 Mar 2013
|align=left| 
| 
|-align=center
|26
|Win
|26–0
|align=left| Dennis Bakhtov
|UD
|10
|02 Jun 2012
|align=left| 
|align=left|
|-align=center
|25
|Win
|25–0
|align=left| Claus Bertino
|UD
|10
|18 Feb 2012
|align=left| 
|
|-align=center
|24
|Win
|24–0
|align=left| Nelson Dario Dominguez
|KO
|2 (10), 2:21
|12 Nov 2011
|align=left| 
|
|-align=center
|23
|Win
|23–0
|align=left| Devin Vargas
|
|9 (10), 1:40
|10 Sep 2011
|align=left| 
|
|-align=center
|22
|Win
|22–0
|align=left| Andreas Sidon
|KO
|1 (8), 2:55
|25 Jun 2011
|align=left| 
|
|-align=center
|21
|Win
|21–0
|align=left| Ivica Perkovic
|UD
|8
|05 Mar 2011
|align=left| 
|
|-align=center
|20
|Win
|20–0
|align=left| Pavel Dolgovs
|UD
|6
|25 Sep 2010
|align=left| 
|
|-align=center
|19
|Win
|19–0
|align=left| Paul Butlin
|UD
|8
|15 May 2010
|align=left| 
|
|-align=center
|18
|Win
|18–0
|align=left| Lee Swaby
|UD
|8
|20 Mar 2010
|align=left| 
|
|-align=center
|17
|Win
|17–0
|align=left| Harvey Jolly
|UD
|8
|19 Jan 2010
|align=left| 
|
|-align=center
|16
|Win
|16–0
|align=left| Oleksiy Mazikin
|UD
|10
|18 Dec 2009
|align=left| 
|align=left|
|-align=center
|15
|Win
|15–0
|align=left| Raymond Ochieng
|TKO
|5 (10), 2:07
|9 May 2009
|align=left| 
|align=left|
|-align=center
|14
|Win
|14–0
|align=left| Edgars Kalnars
|RTD
|3 (10), 3:00
|28 Feb 2009
|align=left| 
|
|-align=center
|13
|Win
|13–0
|align=left| Tomasz Bonin
|UD
|10
|29 Nov 2008
|align=left| 
|align=left|
|-align=center
|12
|Win
|12–0
|align=left| Harry Duiven Jr.
|KO
|8 (10), 1:56
|18 Oct 2008
|align=left| 
|align=left|
|-align=center
|11
|Win
|11–0
|align=left| Aleksandrs Selezens
|UD
|6
|31 May 2008
|align=left| 
|
|-align=center
|10
|Win
|10–0
|align=left| Marcin Najman
|TKO
|2 (10), 1:35
|19 Apr 2008
|align=left| 
|align=left|
|-align=center
|9
|Win
|9–0
|align=left| Yavor Marinchev
|UD
|6
|08 Dec 2007
|align=left| 
|
|-align=center
|8
|Win
|8–0
|align=left| Laszlo Esztan
|TKO
|1 (6), 1:02
|20 Oct 2007
|align=left| 
|
|-align=center
|7
|Win
|7–0
|align=left| Stefan Cirok
|TKO
|1 (6), 2:15
|14 Oct 2007
|align=left| 
|
|-align=center
|6
|Win
|6–0
|align=left| Drazen Ordulj
|RTD
|6 (6), 3:00
|29 Sep 2007
|align=left| 
|
|-align=center
|5
|Win
|5–0
|align=left| Ante Lovric
|TKO
|2 (4), 1:04
|14 Apr 2007
|align=left| 
|
|-align=center
|4
|Win
|4–0
|align=left| Peter Oravec
|TKO
|1 (4), 1:33
|24 Mar 2007
|align=left| 
|
|-align=center
|3
|Win
|3–0
|align=left| Aliaksandr Mazaleu
|TKO
|4 (4)
|03 Mar 2007
|align=left| 
|
|-align=center
|2
|Win
|2–0
|align=left| Martin Stensky
|TKO
|2 (4), 1:01
|25 Nov 2006
|align=left| 
|
|-align=center
|1
|Win
|1–0
|align=left| Ervin Slonka
|UD
|4
|18 Nov 2006
|align=left| 
|

See also
List of current WBC youth world champions

References

External links
 Euro Juniors 2006
 

1987 births
Living people
Heavyweight boxers
Sportspeople from Kraków
Polish male boxers
Doping cases in boxing
Polish sportspeople in doping cases
21st-century Polish people
20th-century Polish people